The Jesse J. and Mary F. Allee House, also known as the Allee Mansion, is a historic house located at 2020 640th Street in Newell, Iowa. The Queen Anne style Victorian house was built in 1891. The Newell Historical Society leased the house in 1988 and subsequently restored it to a Victorian appearance; the historical society now uses the mansion as a museum. The home was added to the National Register of Historic Places in 1992.

References

External links
 Allee Mansion - Newell Historical Society

Houses on the National Register of Historic Places in Iowa
National Register of Historic Places in Buena Vista County, Iowa
Queen Anne architecture in Iowa
Houses completed in 1891
Houses in Buena Vista County, Iowa
Museums in Buena Vista County, Iowa
Historic house museums in Iowa